Shamsi Vuai Nahodha (born 20 November 1962) is a Tanzanian CCM politician and a nominated Member of Parliament since 2010 to 2015. He is a former Minister of Defence and National Service.

Background
He was also the Chief Minister of Zanzibar from 15 November 2000 to 9 November 2010, when that position was abolished. On November 9, 2005, he was reappointed Chief Minister by President Amani Abeid Karume. He is a member of the ruling party, Chama Cha Mapinduzi (CCM).

References

1962 births
Living people
Tanzanian Muslims
Chama Cha Mapinduzi MPs
Tanzanian MPs 2010–2015
Nominated Tanzanian MPs
Defense ministers of Tanzania
Interior ministers of Tanzania
Chief Ministers of Zanzibar
Zanzibari politicians
University of Dar es Salaam alumni
Centre for Foreign Relations alumni
Open University of Tanzania alumni